The Jabiru 5100 is a lightweight four-stroke horizontally opposed flat-eight air-cooled aircraft engine, manufactured by Jabiru Aircraft.

Design and development
The engine is direct-drive and is fitted with alternators, silencers, vacuum pump drives and dual-ignition systems as standard equipment.

It was developed from the Jabiru 2200 and 3300 aeroengines, but whilst these earlier modular-design engines share the same bore and stroke (97.5mm x 74 mm), the 5100 flat-eight shares only the 97.5mm bore, and the stroke is increased from 74mm to 85mm.

In November 2014 the Australian Civil Aviation Safety Authority proposed restricting all Jabiru-powered aircraft to day-visual flight rules only, without passengers or solo students and within gliding distance of a safe place to land due to the engine line's safety record. Both the manufacturer and Recreational Aviation Australia opposed the restrictions as unnecessary and unwarranted. The final rule adopted somewhat softened the restrictions, allowing the carriage of passengers and students, but requiring them to sign an acknowledgement of risk before flying and restricting equipped aircraft to day VFR flight and within gliding distance of a safe place to land.

Applications
Ibis GS-750 Grand Magic
Quikkit Glass Goose

Specifications

See also
ULPower UL520i

References

External links

Boxer engines
1990s aircraft piston engines
Jabiru aircraft engines